Yıldız Clock Tower, is a clock tower situated next to the courtyard of the Yıldız Hamidiye Mosque, in Yıldız neighborhood of Beşiktaş district in Istanbul, Turkey at the European side of Bosphorus.

History
The tower was ordered by the Ottoman Sultan Abdülhamid II (1842–1918) in 1889, and the construction completed in 1890.

Structure
The three-story structure in Ottoman and neo-Gothic style has an octagonal plan. Outside the first floor, there are four inscriptions, the second floor contains a thermometer and a barometer, and the top floor is the clock room. The clock was repaired in 1993. Atop the decorative roof, a compass rose is found.

See also
Yıldız Palace
Yıldız Hamidiye Mosque
List of columns and towers in Istanbul
Dolmabahçe Clock Tower
Etfal Hospital Clock Tower
İzmir Clock Tower
İzmit Clock Tower

External links

 Metropolitan Municipality of Istanbul
 Istanbul’s castles, towers and columns

Buildings and structures in Istanbul
Clock towers in Turkey
Ottoman architecture in Istanbul
Towers completed in 1890
Clock Tower
Beşiktaş
Ottoman clock towers
19th-century architecture in Turkey